Victor A. Tcherikover (‎; 1894–1958) was a Russian-born Israeli scholar.

Biography
Born in Russia, he settled in Palestine in 1925. He was one of the first teachers at the Hebrew University of Jerusalem, and headed the departments of general history and classical studies. He specialized in Jewish history in Palestine and Egypt during the Graeco-Roman period.

Publications
Ha-Yehudim veha-Yevanim ba-tekufah ha-Helenistit, 1930
Hellenistic Civilization and the Jews, 1959
Corpus Papyrorum Judaicarum Vol.1, 2 with Alexander Fuks 1957-1960 - Tcherikover was succeeded for the 3rd volume (1963) by Menahem Stern.

References

1894 births
1958 deaths
20th-century Russian historians
Historians of Jews and Judaism
Academic staff of the Hebrew University of Jerusalem
20th-century Israeli historians
Soviet emigrants to Mandatory Palestine